Information lifecycle management (ILM) refers to strategies for administering storage systems on computing devices.

ILM is the practice of applying certain policies to effective information management. This practice had its basis in the management of information in paper or other physical forms (microfilm, negatives, photographs, audio or video recordings and other assets).

ILM includes every phase of a "record" from its beginning to its end. And while it is generally applied to information that rises to the classic definition of a record (and thus related to records management), it applies to all informational assets. During its existence, information can become a record by being identified as documenting a business transaction or as satisfying a business need. In this sense ILM has been part of the overall approach of enterprise content management.

However, in a more general perspective the term "business" must be taken in a broad sense, and not forcibly tied to direct commercial or enterprise contexts. While most records are thought of as having a relationship to enterprise business, not all do. Much recorded information serves to document an event or a critical point in history. Examples of these are birth, death, medical/health and educational records. e-Science, for example, is an area where ILM has become relevant.

In 2004, the Storage Networking Industry Association, on behalf of the information technology (IT) and information storage industries, attempted to assign a new broader definition to Information Lifecycle Management (ILM).  The oft-quoted definition that it released that October at the Storage Networking World conference in Orlando, Florida, stated that "ILM  the policies, processes, practices, and tools used to align the business value of information with the most appropriate and cost-effective IT infrastructure from the time information is conceived through its final disposition." In this view, information is aligned with business processes through management policies and service levels associated with applications, metadata, information, and data.

Policy
ILM policy consists of the overarching storage and information policies that drive management processes.  Policies are dictated by business goals and drivers.  Therefore, policies generally tie into a framework of overall IT governance and management; change control processes; requirements for system availability and recovery times; and service level agreements (SLAs).

Operational
Operational aspects of ILM include backup and data protection; disaster recovery, restore, and restart; archiving and long-term retention; data replication; and day-to-day processes and procedures necessary to manage a storage architecture.

Infrastructure
Infrastructure facets of ILM include the logical and physical architectures; the applications dependent upon the storage platforms; security of storage; and data center constraints.  Within the application realm, the relationship between applications and the production, test, and development requirements are generally most relevant for ILM.

Functionality
For the purposes of business records, there are five phases identified as being part of the lifecycle continuum along with one exception. These are:
 Creation and Receipt
 Distribution
 Use
 Maintenance
 Disposition

Creation and receipt deals with records from their point of origination. This could include their creation by a member of an organization at varying levels or receipt of information from an external source. It includes correspondence, forms, reports, drawings, computer input/output, or other sources.

Distribution is the process of managing the information once it has been created or received. This includes both internal and external distribution, as information that leaves an organization becomes a record of a transaction with others.

Use takes place after information is distributed internally, and can generate business decisions, document further actions, or serve other purposes.

Maintenance is the management of information. This can include processes such as filing, retrieval and transfers. While the connotation of 'filing' presumes the placing of information in a prescribed container and leaving it there, there is much more involved. Filing is actually the process of arranging information in a predetermined sequence and creating a system to manage it for its useful existence within an organization. Failure to establish a sound method for filing information makes its retrieval and use nearly impossible. Transferring information refers to the process of responding to requests, retrieval from files and providing access to users authorized by the organization to have access to the information. While removed from the files, the information is tracked by the use of various processes to ensure it is returned and/or available to others who may need access to it.

Disposition is the practice of handling information that is less frequently accessed or has met its assigned retention periods. Less frequently accessed records may be considered for relocation to an 'inactive records facility' until they have met their assigned retention period. "Although a small percentage of organizational information never loses its value, the value of most information tends to decline over time until it has no further value to anyone for any purpose. The value of nearly all business information is greatest soon after it is created and generally remains active for only a short time --one to three years or so-- after which its importance and usage declines. The record then makes its life cycle transition to a semi-active and finally to an inactive state." Retention periods are based on the creation of an organization-specific retention schedule, based on research of the regulatory, statutory and legal requirements for management of information for the industry in which the organization operates. Additional items to consider when establishing a retention period are any business needs that may exceed those requirements and consideration of the potential historic, intrinsic or enduring value of the information. If the information has met all of these needs and is no longer considered to be valuable, it should be disposed of by means appropriate for the content. This may include ensuring that others cannot obtain access to outdated or obsolete information as well as measures for protection privacy and confidentiality.'

Long-term records are those that are identified to have a continuing value to an organization. Based on the period assigned in the retention schedule, these may be held for periods of 25 years or longer, or may even be assigned a retention period of "indefinite" or "permanent". The term "permanent" is used much less frequently outside of the Federal Government, as it is not feasible to establish a requirement for such a retention period. There is a need to ensure records of a continuing value are managed using methods that ensure they remain persistently accessible for length of the time they are retained. While this is relatively easy to accomplish with paper or microfilm based records by providing appropriate environmental conditions and adequate protection from potential hazards, it is less simple for electronic format records. There are unique concerns related to ensuring the format they are generated/captured in remains viable and the media they are stored on remains accessible. Media is subject to both degradation and obsolescence over its lifespan, and therefore, policies and procedures must be established for the periodic conversion and migration of information stored electronically to ensure it remains accessible for its required retention periods.

Exceptions occur with non-recurring issues outside the normal day-to-day operations. One example of this is a legal hold, litigation hold or legal freeze is requested by an attorney. What follows is that the records manager will place a legal hold inside the records management application which will stop the files from being enqueued for disposition.

See also
 Automated tiered storage
 ARMA International
 Application retirement
 Computer data storage
 Data classification (disambiguation)
 Data proliferation
 Digital asset management
 Digital continuity
 Digital preservation
 Document management
 Enterprise content management
 Hierarchical storage management
 Information governance
 Information repository
 Records management

Footnotes

References
Stephens, David O. Records Management: Making the Transition from Paper to Electronic. Overland Park, KS: ARMA International, 2007.

External links
 U.S. Federal Rules on discovery of electronically stored information (ESI)

Records management